{{Infobox film
| name           = Page 3
| image          = Page 3 poster.jpg
| caption        = Theatrical release poster
| director       = Madhur Bhandarkar, Jay Dev Banerjee
| producer       = Bobby PushkarnaKavita Pushkarna
| screenplay     = Manoj TyagiNina Arora
| starring       = 
| music          = Songs:Virgin EmiSamir TandonBackground Score:Raju Singh
| cinematography = Madhu Rao
| editing        = Suresh Pai
| distributor    = Lighthouse Films Pvt. Ltd.Sahara One Motion Pictures
| released       = 
| runtime        = 139 minutes
| language       = Hindi
| country        = India
}}Page 3 is a 2005 Indian drama film directed by Madhur Bhandarkar and produced by Bobby Pushkarna and Kavita Pushkarna about the Page 3 culture and media in the city of Mumbai. It stars Konkona Sen Sharma, Atul Kulkarni, Sandhya Mridul, Tara Sharma, Anju Mahendru, and Boman Irani. The film won three National Film Awards, including the Golden Lotus Award for Best Film.

Plot
Madhavi Sharma (Konkona Sen Sharma) is a young journalist, who arrives in Mumbai looking for a job. She is hired by newspaper editor Deepak Suri (Boman Irani), and is assigned the task of reporting on celebrity news, writing articles for Page 3. Her roommate Pearl Sequiera (Sandhya Mridul) is an air hostess who aims to marry a rich man so that she can have a lavish, exciting lifestyle. Gayatri Sachdeva (Tara Sharma), an aspiring actress, later joins them at the apartment. Gayatri becomes romantically involved with a leading actor, Rohit Kumar (Bikram Saluja), and soon finds out that she is pregnant. Rohit is aware that the pregnancy will ruin his career so he tells her to get an abortion. Depressed and shattered, Gayarti unsuccessfully tries to commit suicide and, in the process, loses her child. Meanwhile, Pearl marries a wealthy old man and moves to the United States, where she lives an extravagant but loveless life. Madhavi plans to expose Rohit by writing an article on his relationship with Gayatri, but her editor blocks the story, and she is forced to apologize to Rohit.

Madhavi finds that her boyfriend is bisexual; she finds him in bed with her best friend, Abhijeet (Rehaan Engineer). Soon, Madhavi becomes disillusioned with her job, and she realises that 'the party is over' for her - the celebrity lifestyle is not as glamorous as it seems. She requests to be moved to a different field, and lands on the "crime beat" with Vinayak Mane (Atul Kulkarni). She accompanies Vinayak as they search the city for crime related stories. On one such trip, they witness a bomb blast in the city, which affects Madhavi emotionally. She begins to investigate the story, but is made to cover a high-profile Bollywood party by Deepak. At the party, she comes across the ACP in charge of the bomb blast she witnessed, insensitively discussing the incident. Madhavi is shocked to find out that the ACP was attending a film shoot while he was on duty, which delayed his reaction to the blast.

Vinayak goes to cover another news story in Nashik, Madhavi is asked to take charge of crime news. She learns that a number of boys from a rehabilitation home owned by Anjali Thapar have gone missing, and during the subsequent search, a number of boys could not be accounted for. The police find out that a group of boys are being held at the Thapar's private bungalow in Mud Island; but they do not have a search warrant. However, based on Madhavi's investigation, they conduct a raid. Ramesh Thapar has been molesting children from the rehabilitation home. Ramesh is arrested and police also find a connection to other corporate personalities who are involved in the scandal. Madhavi manages to capture the whole event on camera, and develops a breaking exposé story. She asks Deepak to run the story as the headline article for the next day's news edition, and he promises to look into the piece and put it on the front page. That same night Deepak meets with the owner of the newspaper, Mr. Agarwal, who is the best friend of Ramesh. Agarwal tells Deepak that the newspaper receives major advertisement revenue and other sponsorship from Ramesh. Fearing major loss to his business, Agarwal declines to publish the story, and asks Deepak to fire Madhavi from the company.

Gayatri supposedly turned her back on Bollywood and returned to Delhi, but returns to Mumbai. In order to make a name for herself, she sleeps with a film director and gets cast in his next film. Madhavi, who got a job as a Page 3 writer for another newspaper, realises that in the elite and extravagant lives of politicians, businessmen, film stars and socialites, there is no place for trust and honour.

Cast

 Konkona Sen Sharma as Madhavi Sharma
 Atul Kulkarni as Vinayak Mane
 Sandhya Mridul as Pearl Sequeira
 Tara Sharma as Gayatri Sachdeva
 Anju Mahendru as Ritu Bajaj
 Boman Irani as Deepak Suri
 Bikram Saluja as Rohit Kumar
 Nassar Abdullah as Romesh Thapar, Industrialist
 Rehaan Engineer as Abhijeet Patnaik
 Soni Razdan as Anjali Thapar, Romesh's wife
 Kunika Lal as Monaz Modi
 Kurush Deboo as Hiren Sanghvi
 Madan Jain as ACP Uday Yadav
 Bobby Darling as Fashion Designer Zulfi Khan
 Manoj Joshi as Bosco, Chauffeur
 Suhasini Mulay as Pratima Bhave
 Maya Alagh as Pushpa Bhargav
 Upendra Limaye as Inspector Arun Bhonsle
 Dolly Thakore as Vijaya Agarwal, wife of Pramod Agarwal
 Yusuf Hasan as Pramod Agarwal, chairman of Agarwal Publications
 Suchitra Pillai as Fashion Designer Sonal Roy
 Darshan Jariwala as Mr. Tejani
 Navni Parihar as Sheetal Tejani
 Kishen Mulchandani as Page 3 Socialite in guest appearance
 Mukesh Tyagi as Member of Parliament
 Jai Kalra as Tarun Sanyal
 Parmita Katkar as Dancer (in the song Kuwa Maa) in guest appearance
 Gopal K Singh as Gomes, Drug Supplier
 Samir Modi as Page 3 socialite
 Major Bikramjeet Kanwarpal as Page 3 socialite
 Tony Singh as Page 3 socialite
 Madan Joshi as Page 3 socialite
 Sunil Shetty as himself cameo appearance
 
 Palak Shukla as Fauziya Journalist

Soundtracks

All songs of this film were composed by Shamir Tandon. The soundtrack album was released on 11 September 2004 and contains 8 tracks in Standard Edition and 12 tracks in Complete Edition. Zubeen Garg and Mahalakshmi Iyer were supposed to sing a song for the film, but, due to unknown reason, both were opted out.

Note
 Track 6 and 8 were not appeared in the film.

Note
 Track 6, 10 and 12 were not appeared in the film.

Box office
The film opened to average opening but with positive word of mouth and raving reviews, it went on to do good business later and emerged a semi hit.

Awards2005 National Film Awards (India) Golden Lotus Award - Best Film - Bobby Pushkarna and Kavita Pushkarna
 Silver Lotus Award - Best Screenplay - Nina Arora, Manoj Tyagi
 Silver Lotus Award - Best Editing - Suresh Pai2005 Zee Cine Awards (India) Best Female Debut - Konkona Sen Sharma

 51st Filmfare Awards:Won Best Screenplay – Nina Arora & Manoj TyagiNominated'''

 Best Film – Bobby Pushkarna and Kavita Pushkarna
 Best Director – Madhur Bhandarkar
 Best Supporting Actress – Sandhya Mridul

Death of Amit Ralli
During principal photography, lead actor Amit Ralli died suddenly from jaundice due to hepatitis C. He was 26 at the time. He was replaced by Jai Kalra who made his Bollywood debut with this film.

See also
 Page 3 culture

References

External links
 

2000s Hindi-language films
2005 films
2005 drama films
Films set in Mumbai
Films about journalists
Films about the mass media in India
Films about pedophilia
Films about women in India
Best Feature Film National Film Award winners
Films directed by Madhur Bhandarkar
Films whose editor won the Best Film Editing National Award
Films whose writer won the Best Original Screenplay National Film Award
Films about Bollywood
Films scored by Shamir Tandon